Stig Hedberg (19 September 1915 – 1 August 1996) was a Swedish sailor. He competed in the Swallow event at the 1948 Summer Olympics.

References

External links
 

1915 births
1996 deaths
Swedish male sailors (sport)
Olympic sailors of Sweden
Sailors at the 1948 Summer Olympics – Swallow
Sportspeople from Stockholm
20th-century Swedish people